The Civilian Marksmanship Program (CMP) is a U.S. government-chartered program intended to promote firearm safety training and rifle practice for all qualified U.S. citizens with a specific emphasis on youth. Any U.S. citizen not otherwise legally prohibited from owning a firearm may purchase a military surplus rifle from the CMP, provided they are a member of a CMP-affiliated club.  The CMP operates through a network of affiliated private organizations, shooting clubs, and state associations across every state in the U.S which variously offer firearms safety training and marksmanship courses as well as continued practice and competition events.

The Office of the Director of Civilian Marksmanship (DCM) was created by the U.S. Congress as part of the 1903 War Department Appropriations Act. The original purpose was to provide civilians an opportunity to learn and practice marksmanship skills should they later be called on to serve in the U.S. military. The formation was precipitated by the adoption of the M1903 Springfield rifle as the national service rifle. Civilians experienced with popular contemporary lever-action rifles were commonly unable to sustain an equivalent rate of fire from the unfamiliar bolt action M1903 rifle.

Since its inception, the emphasis of the program has shifted towards specifically youth training. From 1916 until 1996 the CMP was administered by the National Board for the Promotion of Rifle Practice (NBPRP), an advisory board to the Secretary of the Army (SA). Title XVI of the National Defense Authorization Act for Fiscal Year 1996 (Public Law 104-106, 10 February 1996) created the Corporation for the Promotion of Rifle Practice & Firearms Safety (CPRPFS) to replace the NBPRP. The CPRPFS is a tax-exempt non-profit 501(c)(3) corporation chartered by the U.S. Congress, but is not an agency of the U.S. government (Title 36, United States Code, Section 40701 et seq.). Apart from a donation of surplus .22 and .30 caliber rifles in the Army's inventory to the CMP, the CMP receives no federal funding.

The CMP maintains three main offices: CMP North at Camp Perry near Port Clinton, Ohio, CMP South in Anniston, Alabama and the CMP Talladega Marksmanship Park in Talladega, Alabama.

Programs
The CMP offers the sale of surplus U.S. Army rifles including the M1 Garand, M1903 Springfield, M1917 Enfield, M1 Carbine, .22 caliber (surplus and commercial target), and air rifles (commercial target) for sale to members of affiliated organizations. Ammunition and other accessories are also sold through the CMP's online store. The M1911 pistol was added in 2018. 

CMP-facilitated training programs generally teach safety, responsibility, leadership, and competitive excellence in the shooting sports. The CMP supports, sponsors, and hosts various rifle and pistol competitions across the nation including the National Matches at Camp Perry. They formerly hosted the U.S. Olympics Trials for 10 meter air rifle, and currently host the annual Junior Olympic 3-position air rifle matches, as well as a variety of national junior championships. The CMP runs camps and clinics throughout the year, and their summer camp program offers camps in standing air rifle, 3-position air rifle, and recently added 3-position smallbore.

Competition Tracker
In July 2003, the CMP launched Competition Tracker, an online results system for the shooting sports. Originally designed specifically for the National Trophy matches, the CMP now uses Competition Tracker as the official results bulletin of every CMP competition. In March 2006, during the JROTC National Championships, the CMP used Competition Tracker, in conjunction with Sius Ascor electronic targets, to provide real-time results on the web. On average, it was 45 seconds from the time a shooter fired a shot to when his or her shot value was seen on the Internet. The CMP is currently researching Visual Image Scoring technology that will allow competitors to score traditional paper targets electronically.

CMP and the military services
The U.S. armed forces are authorized to wear marksmanship competition badges, by each service's regulations. These badges are awarded based on points earned at CMP-sponsored competitions or high placement at special CMP competitions. The following is a list of marksmanship competition badges authorized for wear on U.S. military service uniforms based on points earned at CMP competitions:

 U.S. Distinguished International Shooter Badge (All services)
 Distinguished Rifleman Badge (Army, Air Force, & U.S. Civilians)
 Distinguished Marksman Badge (Navy, Marine Corps, & Coast Guard)
 Distinguished Pistol Shot Badge (All services)
 President's Hundred Tab/Brassard (Army, Navy, & Coast Guard)
 Army Excellence In Rifle Competition Badge (Silver or Bronze)
 Army Excellence In Pistol Competition Badge (Silver or Bronze)
 Air Force Excellence In Rifle Competition Badge (Silver with Wreath or Bronze with Wreath)
 Air Force Excellence In Pistol Competition Badge (Silver with Wreath or Bronze with Wreath)
 Navy Excellence-in-Competition Rifle Badge (Gold, Silver, or Bronze)
 National, Navy, & Fleet
 Navy Excellence-in-Competition Pistol Badge (Gold, Silver, or Bronze)
 National, Navy, & Fleet
 Marine Corps Rifle Competition Badge (Gold, Silver, or Bronze)
 National, Marine Corps, & Division
 Marine Corps Pistol Competition Badge (Gold, Silver, or Bronze)
 National, Marine Corps, & Division
 Coast Guard Rifleman Excellence-in-Competition Badge (Silver or Bronze)
 National & Coast Guard
 Coast Guard Pistol Shot Excellence in Competition Badge (Silver or Bronze)
 National & Coast Guard

See also 
 International Confederation of Fullbore Rifle Associations (ICFRA), the international sanctioning body of fullbore target rifle (Palma and F-Class)
 High power rifle

References

External links

The Civilian Marksmanship Program homepage
CMP Talladega Marksmanship Park
The First Shot: CMP Online Magazine
Competition Tracker
About the CMP
Meet the CMP Board of Directors
 (US Code defining the CMP)

Gun politics in the United States
Handgun shooting sports
Rifle shooting sports
Patriotic and national organizations chartered by the United States Congress
Marksmanship